Barry Sparks (born June 20, 1968 in Lucasville, Ohio) is an American Rock bassist/Guitarist from legendary artists such as Yngwie Malmsteen, the Michael Schenker Group, UFO, Dokken, and Ted Nugent, amongst others. Currently Sparks is part of the touring band for the Japanese rock group B'z, and has also contributed to many of their albums and singles.

History

Barry Sparks first began to make a name for himself as the bass player for former MCA recording artist Guy Mann-Dude with whom he toured and recorded the 1991 "Mannic Distortion" release. This led to Sparks landing the bass gig with Swedish guitar virtuoso Yngwie Malmsteen in time for The Seventh Sign tour in 1994, followed by a 4-year on-and-off stint with German guitar legend Michael Schenker, starting with the 1996 Written in the Sand album.

In 1997, Sparks and Michael Schenker Group drummer Shane Gaalaas teamed up with guitarist Jeff Kollman to form the all-instrumental fusion trio Cosmosquad with whom Sparks recorded 3 albums before exiting. The trio also backed vocalist John West on his 1998 sophomore release, Permanent Mark. In 1998, Sparks became a touring musician with pop singer Billie Myers of "Kiss the Rain" fame, doing TV and radio station appearances and playing worldwide, including Good Morning America, Top of the Pops in England. They also supported tours with Bob Dylan in Europe, Savage Garden and many others.

In the late 1990s Sparks also guested on albums by former Loudness vocalist Michael Vescera and then Helloween guitarist Roland Grapow, toured with future UFO bandmate Vinnie Moore, and recorded and toured with ex-Scorpions guitar legend Uli Jon Roth.

In 2001, Sparks released his acoustic guitar based solo debut album, Glimmer of Hope, on his own Moonbeam Music label.  A second album, Can't Look Back, with special guest appearances by ZZ Top's Billy Gibbons (on "Breathe") and Ted Nugent (on "Liberty"), followed in 2004.  Sparks began working with Nugent on the "Beer Drinkers & Hell Raisers" U.S. summer tour of 2003.

In 2001, Sparks became the bass player for Dokken, an affiliation that lasted until 2010 and produced 4 studio albums.  During this time, Sparks and Dokken drummer Mick Brown also played with Ted Nugent, documented on the 2008 live release Sweden Rocks.

In 2004, Sparks was called to record bass tracks for the Scorpions' Unbreakable album.  That same year, Sparks filled in for one of his all-time bass heroes, Pete Way of UFO, on the You Are Here U.S. tour. He last toured with the group in 2011.

After previously touring with the band in 2003 for their Big Machine album, Sparks was again recruited by Japanese superstars B'z for their 2008 "Glory Days" tour, re-teaming with his former Yngwie Malmsteen, MSG and Cosmosquad rhythm partner, drummer Shane Gaalaas.  He remained a touring member through 2019 during which time he also recorded many albums and singles with the band.

In 2013, Sparks re-connected with his former Yngwie Malmsteen band mate, vocalist Mike Vescera, in Riot On Mars. The project released their debut album, First Wave, on Zain Records in Japan in 2015. Guest musicians on the album include drummers BJ Zampa and Shane Gaalaas as well as vocalist Dan McCafferty of Nazareth fame who contributes vocals on a cover of the Nazareth classic, "Beggars Day".

Select Discography

Solo
 Glimmer of Hope (2001)
 Can't Look Back (2004)

with Riot On Mars
 First Wave (2015)

with B'z
 B'z Live-Gym Pleasure 2008: Glory Days (Live DVD) (2009)
 Magic (2009)
B'z Live-Gym 2010 Ain't No Magic (Live DVD) (2010)
 C'mon (2011)
B'z Live-Gym 2011 C'mon (Live DVD) (2012)
B'z "Into Free" (2012)
B'z Live Gym 2008 "Action" (Live DVD) (2013)
B'z "The Best 1988-1998" (Bonus tracks)(2013)
B'z "The Best 1999-2012" (2013)
Epic Day (2015)
Dinosaur (2017)

with Ted Nugent
 Love Grenade (2007)
 Sweden Rocks (2008)

with Scorpions
Unbreakable (on tracks 2 & 4) (2004)

with Dokken
 Long Way Home (2002)
 Hell To Pay (2004)
 Lightning Strikes Again (2008)
 Greatest Hits (2010)

with Tony MacAlpine
 Chromaticity (2001)
 Collection: The Shrapnel Years (2006)

with Uli Jon Roth
 Transcendental Sky Guitar (2000)
 Legends of Rock: Live at Castle Donington (2002)

with Vinnie Moore
 Live! (1999)
Collection: The Shrapnel Years (2006)

with Roland Grapow
Kaleidoscope (1999)

with MVP (Mike Vescera Project)
 Windows (1997)

with John West
 Mind Journey (1997)
 Permanent Mark (1998)

with Cosmosquad
 Cosmosquad (1997)
 Squadrophenia (2001)
 Live at the Baked Potato (2002)
 Best of Cosmosquad (2003)

with Miloš Dodo Doležal
 Dodo hraje Hendrixe (1997)

with Michael Schenker Group
 Written in the Sand (1996)
 The Michael Schenker Story Live (1997)
 The Unforgiven World Tour (2000)
 Live in Tokyo 1997 (2000)
Dreams and Expressions" (2000)Universal" (2022)

with Yngwie Malmsteen
 I Can't Wait (1994)
 Magnum Opus (1995)

with Guy Mann-Dude
Mannic Distortion (1991)

References

External links
Barry Sparks official website

1968 births
Living people
People from Lucasville, Ohio
American heavy metal bass guitarists
American rock bass guitarists
Dokken members
Michael Schenker Group members
American male bass guitarists
20th-century American bass guitarists
Ted Nugent Band members
Guitarists from Ohio
20th-century American male musicians
Yngwie J. Malmsteen's Rising Force members